Wayne Smith may refer to:

Politics
 Wayne Smith (diplomat) (born 1932), U.S. diplomat who worked at the U.S. Embassy in Cuba
 Wayne Smith (Texas politician) (born 1943), member of the Texas House of Representatives
 Wayne Smith (Australian politician) (born 1952), member of the New South Wales Legislative Assembly

Sports
 Wayne Smith (defensive back) (born 1957), National Football League, full name Wayne Lester Smith
 Wayne Smith (defensive lineman) (1950–2016), Canadian Football League
 Wayne Smith (offensive lineman) (born 1979), Canadian football, full name Wayne Anthony Smith
 Wayne Smith (rugby league) (born 1956), Australian rugby league player
 Wayne Smith (rugby union) (born 1957), New Zealand rugby coach and former rugby player
 Wayne Smith (ice hockey) (born 1943), NHL

Other
 Wayne C. Smith (1901–1964), U.S. Army general
 Wayne T. Smith (born c. 1946), chairman and CEO of Community Health Systems
 Wayne Smith (musician) (1965–2014), Jamaican reggae musician
 George Wayne Smith (born 1955), bishop of the Episcopal Diocese of Missouri
 Wayne Smith (statistician), Chief Statistician of Canada, AKA Wayne R. Smith
 Wayne Smith (missionary) (1934–2004), founder of Friendship Force International